Conizonia detrita is a species of beetle in the family Cerambycidae. It was described by Johan Christian Fabricius in 1793, originally under the genus Saperda. It is known from Morocco, Algeria, and Tunisia. It feeds on Scolymus hispanicus. It contains the varietas Conizonia detrita var. maculosa.

References

Saperdini
Beetles described in 1793